Hilarigona is a genus of flies in the family Empididae.

Species
H. aberrans (Bezzi, 1909)
H. abnormis (Bezzi, 1909)
H. annulata (Philippi, 1865)
H. anomalicauda Collin, 1933
H. argentata (Philippi, 1865)
H. brachygastra (Philippi, 1865)
H. caishana Smith, 1962
H. chiloensis (Brèthes, 1924)
H. connexiva Collin, 1933
H. crassistyla Collin, 1933
H. cupari Smith, 1962
H. fulvipes (Philippi, 1865)
H. krogeri Frey, 1952
H. majerona Smith, 1962
H. modesta (Philippi, 1865)
H. obscurata (Philippi, 1865)
H. obscuripennis (Philippi, 1865)
H. pexata Collin, 1933
H. polita Collin, 1933
H. producta Collin, 1933
H. pudica Collin, 1933
H. rubripes (Philippi, 1865)
H. setulis Collin, 1933
H. similis Collin, 1933
H. unmaculata Yang & Yang, 1995

References

Empidoidea genera
Empididae